Romana Roszak (born 1 October 1994) is a Polish female handballer for Piotrcovia Piotrków Trybunalski and the Polish national team.

International honours 
Carpathian Trophy:
Winner: 2017

References

1994 births
Living people
Polish female handball players
People from Gostyń
21st-century Polish women